The Newburyport Harbor Light, also known as Plum Island Light, built in 1788, is a historic lighthouse on Northern Boulevard in Newburyport, Massachusetts.

The original 4th order Fresnel lens is still in use, one of only five original glass Fresnel lenses still in use in Massachusetts.

The light is now owned by the City of Newburyport and is leased to the Friends of Plum Island Light.

It was added to the National Register of Historic Places as Newburyport Harbor Light on June 15, 1987, reference number 87001485.

See also
National Register of Historic Places listings in Essex County, Massachusetts

References

Lighthouses completed in 1788
Lighthouses completed in 1898
Lighthouses on the National Register of Historic Places in Massachusetts
Buildings and structures in Newburyport, Massachusetts
Lighthouses in Essex County, Massachusetts
National Register of Historic Places in Essex County, Massachusetts
1788 establishments in Massachusetts